Ronald Rensch (born 8 July 1966) is a German sailor. He competed in the men's 470 event at the 1996 Summer Olympics.

References

External links
 

1966 births
Living people
German male sailors (sport)
Olympic sailors of Germany
Sailors at the 1996 Summer Olympics – 470
Sportspeople from Neuruppin